The Canada men's national artistic gymnastics team represents Canada in FIG international competitions.

History
Canada has sent a men' team to compete at the Olympic Games five times.  Their best finish came in 1984, where they finished in seventh place.

Current roster

Team competition results

Olympic Games
 1968 – 16th place
 Barry Brooker, Roger Dion, Sid Jensen, Gilbert Larose, Steve Mitruk
 1984 – 7th place
 Warren Long, Allan Reddon, Brad Peters, Frank Nutzenberger, Philippe Chartrand, Daniel Gaudet
 1988 – 9th place
 Curtis Hibbert, Brad Peters, Lorne Bobkin, Alan Nolet, James Rozon, Philippe Chartrand
 2004 – 11th place (did not qualify for team final)
 Grant Golding, Ken Ikeda, Sasha Jeltkov, David Kikuchi, Kyle Shewfelt, Adam Wong
 2008 – 9th place (did not qualify for team final)
 Grant Golding, David Kikuchi, Kyle Shewfelt, Adam Wong, Brandon O'Neill, Nathan Gafuik

World Championships

 2018 – 18th place (did not qualify for team final)
 Zachary Clay, Rene Cournoyer, Scott Morgan, Cory Paterson, Samuel Zakutney
 2019 – 17th place (did not qualify for team final)
 Rene Cournoyer, William Emard, Cory Paterson, Jackson Payne, Samuel Zakutney
 2022 – 10th place (did not qualify for team final)
 Zachary Clay, Félix Dolci, William Emard, Chris Kaji, Samuel Zakutney

Junior World Championships
 2019 — 5th place
 Ioannis Chronopoulos, Félix Dolci, Evgeny Siminiuc

Most decorated gymnasts
This list includes all Canadian male artistic gymnasts who have won a medal at the Olympic Games or the World Artistic Gymnastics Championships.

See also 
 Canada women's national artistic gymnastics team

References 

Gymnastics in Canada
National men's artistic gymnastics teams
Gymnastics